The Church of the Holy Transfiguration is a Serbian Orthodox church in Novo Sarajevo, Sarajevo, Bosnia and Herzegovina.

Originally planned for Split in Croatia, it was built in 1940 by Aleksandar Deroko and consecrated by Serbian Patriarch Gavrilo V. It was the place of worship for 50,000 adherents in the region. It is the only Orthodox church in Novo Sarajevo.

During the Yugoslav Wars, the Church was heavily damaged, and after the war it was renovated. Reworking of frescoes began in 2004.

See also 
Serb Orthodox Cathedral (Sarajevo)
Serbs of Sarajevo

External links 
Dabro-Bosnian Metropolitanate
70th Church anniversary

Round churches
Serbian Orthodox church buildings in Bosnia and Herzegovina
Serbian Orthodox churches in Sarajevo
Novo Sarajevo
Neo-Byzantine architecture
Churches completed in 1940
20th-century Serbian Orthodox church buildings